Timimoun Airport is an airport serving Timimoun, a town in the Adrar Province of Algeria .

Airlines and destinations

Statistics

See also

Transport in Algeria
List of airports in Algeria

References

External links 
 
 
 

Airports in Algeria
Buildings and structures in Adrar Province